In Egyptian mythology, Sekhmet ( or Sachmis, from), is a warrior goddess as well as goddess of medicine.

Sekhmet is a solar deity, sometimes called the daughter of Ra and often associated with the goddesses Hathor and Bastet.

Roles 
Sekhmet was the daughter of the sun god, Ra, and was among the more important of the goddesses who acted as the vengeful manifestation of Ra's power, the Eye of Ra. Sekhmet was said to breathe fire, and the hot winds of the desert were likened to her breath. She was also believed to cause plagues (which were called as her servants or messengers) although she was also called upon to ward off disease.

In a myth about the end of Ra's rule on the earth, Ra sends the goddess Hathor, in the form of Sekhmet, to destroy mortals who conspired against him. In the myth, Sekhmet's blood-lust was not quenched at the end of battle that led to her destroying almost all of humanity. To stop her Ra poured out beer dyed with red ochre or hematite so that it resembled blood. Mistaking the beer for blood, she became so drunk that she gave up the slaughter and returned peacefully to Ra. The same myth was also described in the prognosis texts of the Calendar of Lucky and Unlucky Days of papyrus Cairo 86637.In other versions of this story, Sekhmet grew angered at the deception and left Egypt, diminishing the power of the sun. This threatened the power and security of the world—thus, she was persuaded by the god Thoth to return and restore the sun to its full glory. Her mythical portrayal was among the more important of the goddesses who acted as the vengeful manifestation of Ra's power, the Eye of Ra. Her attributes and her iconography sometimes makes it difficult to differentiate Sekhmet from other feline goddesses – mainly Bastet.

Sekhmet was considered the wife of the god Ptah and mother of his son Nefertum. She was also said to be the mother of a lion god, Maahes. She was also considered to be the sister of the cat goddess Bastet. The lion-headed goddess Sekhmet is the most represented deity in most Egyptian collections worldwide. Many amulets depict her image but her numerous statues abound Egyptian art. Many of her statues can be found in museums and archaeological sites, and her presence testifies to the historical and cultural importance of this goddess.

Worship 
During an annual festival held at the beginning of the year, a festival of intoxication, the Egyptians danced and played music to soothe the wildness of the goddess and drank great quantities of wine ritually to imitate the extreme drunkenness that stopped the wrath of the goddess—when she almost destroyed humanity.In 2006, Betsy Bryan, an archaeologist with Johns Hopkins University excavating at the temple of Mut in Luxor (Thebes) presented her findings about the festival that included illustrations of the priestesses being served to excess and its adverse effects on them being ministered to by temple attendants. Participation in the festival was great, including by the priestesses and the population. Historical records of tens of thousands attending the festival exist. These findings were made in the temple of Mut because when Thebes rose to greater prominence Mut absorbed some characteristics of Sekhmet. These temple excavations at Luxor discovered a "porch of drunkenness" built onto the temple by the Pharaoh Hatshepsut during the height of her twenty-year reign.

During the Greek dominance in Egypt, note was made of a temple for Maahes that was an auxiliary facility to a large temple to Sekhmet at Taremu in the Delta region, a city which the Greeks called Leontopolis.

Comparative scholarship
In the 1960s it has been argued that the Hindu goddess Kālī, who is first attested in the 7th century CE, shares some characteristics with some ancient Near Eastern goddesses, such  wearing a necklace of heads and a belt of severed hands like Anat, and drinking blood like the Egyptian goddess Sekhmet and that therefore that her character might have been influenced by them. A myth describes how Kali became ecstatic with the joy of battle and slaughter while killing demons, and refused to stop until she was pacified by her consort, Shiva, who threw himself under her feet. Marvin H. Pope in 1977 asserted that this myth exhibits parallels to the Egyptian myth in which Sekhmet was sent by Ra to destroy the humans plotting against him only to become so captured by her blood-lust that she would not stop despite Ra himself becoming distressed and wishing an end to the killing, only to be stopped by a ruse whereby a plain was flooded with beer which had been dyed red, which Sekhmet mistook for blood and drank until she became too inebriated to continue killing, this saving humanity from destruction.

See also 
 Tefnut
 List of solar deities
 List of war deities
 List of health deities
 Lion

References

Bibliography

External links

 Ancient Egypt: the Mythology - Sekhmet
 "Egyptian Temple Yields 17 Statues of Lion-Headed Goddess" Archaeologists working in Luxor, Egypt, have unearthed 17 statues of an ancient Egyptian goddess with the head of a lion and the body of a woman. 14 March 2006

 
Animal goddesses
Anthropomorphic animals
Destroyer goddesses
Egyptian goddesses
Health goddesses
Lion deities
Solar goddesses
War goddesses
Medicine goddesses
Plague gods